Masson was a French publisher which specialized principally in medical and scientific books and journals. It also published textbooks for secondary and tertiary education.

Company history
In 1802, Nicolas Crochard set up as a printer and bookseller in Paris in association with Pierre-Antoine-Louis Allut. In 1804, Crochard continued the business on his own and from 1807, he specialised in scientific and medical publishing. In 1826, he passed the business to his son Eugène Crochard, who from 1835. would run the business with Victor Masson (1807—1879). In 1846, Masson became the sole proprietor of the firm under the name La Librairie Victor Masson.

The ownership of the firm was passed to his son, Georges Masson (1839—1900), who in 1900 passed the firm to Pierre-Victor Masson (1865—1928). In the 1930s, Georges Masson (1900—1973) ran the company. Over the years the firm's name changed to Victor Masson & fils and then in 1896 to Librairie Masson et Compagnie (Masson & Cie).

In 1987, Masson purchased Armand Colin. In turn, it became part of the City Group in 1994. In 2000, Groupe de la Cité became part of Vivendi Universal Publishing (VUP). VUP sold its medical and trade publishing to a group led by Cinven in 2002, who formed MediMedia. In 2005, MediMedia sold its European and U.S. Netter professional medical publishing businesses to Reed Elsevier. Masson merged with Elsevier France, creating Elsevier Masson. The company has been managed by Daniel Rodriguez since 2013.

Notable publications 
 Dictionnaire encyclopédique des sciences médicales (1864—89)
 E. Brissaud, A. Pinard and P. Reclus, Nouvelle pratique médico-chirurgicale illustrée: Chirurgie, médecine, obstétrique, thérapeutique, dermatologie etc. (8 volumes, 1911—12)
 G. H. Roger and Léon Binet, Traité de Physiologie normale et pathologique (11 volumes, 1925)
 Gerolf Steiner, Anatomie et biologie des rhinogrades: Un nouvel ordre de mammifères (1962) — Masson's French language translation of a book about a fictitious order called the Rhinogradentia
 Marcel Brombart and Henri Monges, Atlas de radiologie clinique du tube digestif (1964)
 Manuel diagnostique et statistique des troubles mentaux (DSM) (1983— ) — "la bible des psychiatres" — French, Italian and Spanish editions published by Masson
 Masson French-English Medical Dictionary in electronic form for the Macintosh and Microsoft Windows computer platforms (published in association with the language software company Ultralingua, 2000)

Book series

19th century
 Bibliothèque Polytechnique

20th century
 Collection des précis médicaux (78 monographs by 1914)
Many new titles published as medical knowledge evolved, such as:
 Cahiers de médecine
 Cahiers de psychothérapie
 Cahiers de radiologie
 Cahiers de l’infirmière

21st century
Some of the 107 series available in 2005 were:
 Abrégés de médecine
 Abrégés de pharmacie
 Accès santé
 Aide-mémoire
 Atlas pratiques de médecine
 Bibliothèque clinique psychanalytique
 Dictionnaires pratiques
 Expliquez-moi docteur
 Imagerie radiologique
 Pour le praticien
 Savoir et pratique infirmière

References

Further reading
 Masson et Cie 1804-1954: un siècle et demie d'édition médicale et scientifique, Paris: Masson et Cie, 1954

External links
  - Elsevier Masson
 Masson: Editeur Médical et Paramédical website as at 2005

Book publishing companies of France
Elsevier imprints